The 2021–22 Sheffield Shield season was the 120th season of the Sheffield Shield, the domestic first-class cricket competition that was played in Australia. The tournament started in September 2021 ahead of the 2021–22 Ashes series. Queensland were the defending champions.

Initially, on 21 July 2021, Cricket Australia confirmed all the fixtures for the tournament. On 8 September 2021, Cricket Australia announced that the previous schedule had been scrapped due to ongoing lockdowns in Sydney and Melbourne and subsequent border restrictions. The fixtures for the first two matches were confirmed, with the full revised schedule to be released later. However, the Round one's second match of the season, between Queensland and Tasmania, was postponed following an increase of COVID-19 cases in the state of Queensland.

On 1 October 2021, Cricket Australia confirmed the fixtures for next three matches. On 20 October 2021, Cricket Australia confirmed the next set of fixtures, following the border openings in Sydney and Melbourne. On 5 November 2021, Cricket Australia confirmed the schedule for three further fixtures, with the venue of the fifth round's first match between South Australia and Queensland that would have been decided based on the location of WBBL07 season finals. Later, on 21 November 2021, it was confirmed that the match would take place at Karen Rolton Oval, after the WBBL07 finals venue was confirmed as Adelaide Oval.

On 19 November 2021, the start of the match between New South Wales and Victoria was delayed, after Victoria player Will Sutherland's COVID-19 test result required further analysis. Despite the positive test, Cricket Australia confirmed that the match would start a day later than planned on 20 November 2021.

Western Australia were the first team to reach the final of the competition, with them hosting the final for the first time since the 1997–98 Sheffield Shield season. Victoria finished in second place to join Western Australia in the final. The final ended in a draw, with Western Australia winning the tournament having earned more bonus points in their first 100 overs compared to Victoria.

Points table

Round-Robin stage
Source:

Round 1

Round 2

Round 3

Round 4

Round 5

Round 6

Round 7

Round 8

Round 9

Final

References

External links
 Series home at ESPN Cricinfo

Sheffield Shield
Sheffield Shield
Sheffield Shield seasons
Sheffield Shield season, 2021-22